The UNIVAC 1050 was a variable word-length (one to 16 characters) decimal and binary computer.

Instructions were fixed length (30 bits – five characters), consisting of a five-bit "op code", a three-bit index register specifier, one reserved bit, a 15-bit address, and a six-bit "detail field" whose function varies with each instruction. The memory was up to 32K of six-bit characters.

Like the IBM 1401, the 1050 was commonly used as an off-line peripheral controller in many installations of both large "scientific computers and large "business computers". In these installations the big computer (e.g., a UNIVAC III) did all of its input-output on magnetic tapes and the 1050 was used to format input data from other peripherals (e.g., punched card readers) on the tapes and transfer output data from the tapes to other peripherals (e.g., punched card punches or the line printer).

A version used by the U.S. Air Force, the U1050-II real-time system, had some extra peripherals.  The most significant of these was the FASTRAND 1 Drum Storage Unit.  This physically large device had two contra-rotating drums mounted horizontally, one above the other in a pressurized cabinet.  Read-write heads were mounted on a horizontally moving beam between the drums, driven by a voice coil servo external to the pressurized cabinet.  This high-speed access subsystem allowed the real-time operation.  Another feature was the communications subsystem with modem links to remote sites.  A Uniservo VI-C tape drive provided an audit trail for the transactions. Other peripherals were the card reader and punch, and printer.  The operator's console had the 'stop and go' buttons and a Teletype Model 33 teleprinter for communication and control.

External links
UNIVAC 1050 documents at bitsavers.org
 YouTube Video: "UNIVAC 1050-II"

1050
Variable word length computers